Slovakia competed at the 2014 Winter Olympics in Sochi, Russia, from 7 to 23 February 2014. The team consisted of 63 athletes in 9 sports.

Medalists

Alpine skiing 

According to the quota allocation released on 27 January 2014, Slovakia qualified a total of nine athletes in alpine skiing.

Men

Women

Biathlon 

Based on their performance at the 2012 and 2013 Biathlon World Championships, Slovakia qualified 5 men and 5 women.

Men

Women

Mixed

Bobsleigh 

* – Denotes the driver of each sled

Cross-country skiing 

Slovakia qualified for the following events according to the quota allocation by the International Ski Federation (FIS).

Distance

Sprint

Figure skating 

Slovakia achieved the following quota places:

Freestyle skiing 

Slopestyle

Ice hockey 

Slovakia qualified a men's team by being one of the 9 highest ranked teams in the IIHF World Ranking following the 2012 World Championships.

Men's tournament

Roster

Group stage

Qualification Play-offs

Luge 

Slovakia qualified a total of six athletes, and a spot in the team relay.

Short track speed skating 

Women

References

External links 

Slovakia at the 2014 Winter Olympics

Nations at the 2014 Winter Olympics
2014
Winter Olympics